Rangárþing eystra is a municipality located in southern Iceland in the Southern Region, between Eystri Rangá in the west and Jökulsá á Sólheimasandi in the east. The largest settlements are Skógar and Hvolsvöllur.

References

External links
Official website 

Municipalities of Iceland